The 1985 Northwestern Wildcats team represented Northwestern University during the 1985 Big Ten Conference football season. In their fifth year under head coach Dennis Green, the Wildcats compiled a 3–8 record (1–7 against Big Ten Conference opponents) and finished in a tie for last place in the Big Ten Conference.

The team's offensive leaders were quarterback Mike Greenfield with 2,152 passing yards, Stanley Davenport with 598 rushing yards, and Curtis Duncan with 498 receiving yards.

Schedule

Personnel
QB Mike Greenfield, Soph.
QB Sandy Schwab, Sr.

References

Northwestern
Northwestern Wildcats football seasons
Northwestern Wildcats football